Indira Naik is a Sufi and ghazal singer from Mumbai, India. She is classically trained in the Patiala Gayaki. She has been performing ghazals, bhajans and Sufi for more than 20 years in India and abroad. Sufism is an inspiration for her.

Early life
Indira was exposed to music at a very early age as her father is a Sarod and Sitar player and mother a Bharat Natyam guru.

Winning in her school singing competitions made her parents and herself take music seriously and Indira started training under Pt. Satyanarayan Singh of the Patiala gharana. Later Mohinderjeet Singh  train her voice. Over the years, she studied under Dayal Thakur and ghazals under the late Vithal Rao of Hyderabad.

Album releases
 Krishna Krishna - Bhajan album (1994)
 Run Jhun - Gujrati Sugam Sangeet (1994)
 Aap Ke Liye - Ghazal album (1998)
 Tassavur - Ghazal album (2009)

Other
 Playback for TV serials – Saaya, Alaap, Phir Bhi Dil Hai Hindustani, Bhabhi 
 Playback for commercials like MDH masala, Flair pens, etc.
 Gana Kala Vani Awards from Trinity Arts Festival
 Playback for the film – Main Madhuri Dixit Banna Chahti Hoon
 Playback for the film division documentary on Kashmir – Suraj Ka Parivar

Concerts in India

 World Urdu Conference, Hyderabad
 RAPA Awards, Mumbai
 International Public Relations Society Conference, New Delhi
 Andhra Pradesh Tourism Annual Ghazal Festival, Hyderabad
 Meerabai Foundation, Chittorgarh
 Tarannum Society, Gurgaon
 Hanuman Jayanti Concert, Rajasthan, shared the performance with Shri Anup Jalota

International concerts

 Rehma Community Service (Toronto, Canada)
 Independence Day Celebration, Indian High Commission (Chicago) 
 Hindu Samaj (Portugal)
 International Peace Day Santa Fe, New Mexico, U.S.)
 Maharashtra Mandal Ganesh Chaturthi Festival (London, UK) 
 International Council for Cultural Relations]] (Brunei)
 Asian Metropolitan Association (Chicago) 
 Aligarh University Alumni Association (Michigan)

References

Place of birth missing (living people)
Year of birth missing (living people)
Living people
Indian women classical singers
Indian Sufis
20th-century Indian singers
20th-century Indian women singers
21st-century Indian singers
21st-century Indian women singers
Singers from Mumbai
Women musicians from Maharashtra